The men's rugby sevens tournament at the 2020 Summer Olympics was held in Japan. It was hosted at Tokyo Stadium, which also served as a host stadium of the 2019 Rugby World Cup. The tournament was played over three days from 26–28 July 2021. The tournament was won by the returning champions, Fiji.

Competition schedule

Qualification

 Notes:

Group stage

Group A

Group B

Group C

Ranking of third-placed teams
The top two of the third-placed teams advance to the knockout rounds.

Knockout stage

9–12th place playoff

Semi-finals

Eleventh place match

Ninth place match

5–8th place playoff

Semi-finals

Seventh place match

Fifth place match

Medal playoff

Quarter-finals

Semi-finals

Bronze medal match

Gold medal match

Final ranking

Source

Player statistics

Try scorers

6 tries
 Marcos Moneta

5 tries
 Scott Curry
 Jiuta Wainiqolo

4 tries
 Ignacio Mendy
 Lachie Miller
 Connor Braid
 Asaeli Tuivuaka
 Ben Harris
 Dan Norton
 Chihito Matsui
 Selvyn Davids

3 tries
 Lautaro Bazán
 Nick Malouf
 Josh Turner
 Justin Douglas
 Sireli Maqala
 Aminiasi Tuimaba
 Gavin Mullin
 Andrew Knewstubb
 Tim Mikkelson
 William Warbrick
 Stedman Gans
 Perry Baker
 Carlin Isles

2 tries
 Luciano González
 Matías Osadczuk
 Samu Kerevi
 Maurice Longbottom
 Harry Jones
 Meli Derenalagi
 Waisea Nacuqu

2 tries (cont.)
 Jerry Tuwai
 Alex Davis
 Ollie Lindsay-Hague
 Jordan Conroy
 Hugo Lennox
 Harry McNulty
 Kazushi Hano
 Lote Tuqiri
 Collins Injera
 Jeff Oluoch
 Dylan Collier
 Ngarohi McGarvey-Black
 Sione Molia
 Regan Ware
 Ronald Brown
 Justin Geduld
 Siviwe Soyizwapi
 Andre Jin Coquillard
 Yeon Sik Jeong
 Madison Hughes
 Martin Iosefo
 Stephen Tomasin

1 try
 Santiago Álvarez
 Lucio Cinti
 Rodrigo Isgro
 Santiago Mare
 Gastón Revol
 Germán Schulz
 Lachie Anderson
 Nathan Lawson
 Dylan Pietsch
 Dietrich Roache
 Phil Berna
 Nathan Hirayama
 Patrick Kay

1 try (cont.)
 Theo Sauder
 Napolioni Bolaca
 Iosefo Masi
 Semi Radradra
 Dan Bibby
 Robbie Fergusson
 Harry Glover
 Ross McCann
 Tom Mitchell
 Ethan Waddleton
 Foster Horan
 Terry Kennedy
 Mark Roche
 Masakatsu Hikosaka
 Ryota Kano
 Kameli Soejima
 Willy Ambaka
 Andrew Amonde
 Jacob Ojee
 Johnstone Olindi
 Vincent Onyala
 Alvin Otieno
 Daniel Taabu
 Etene Nanai-Seturo
 Joe Webber
 Kurt-Lee Arendse
 Zain Davids
 Chris Dry
 Sako Makata
 JC Pretorius
 Impi Visser
 Jeong Min Jang
 Danny Barrett
 Joe Schroeder
 Brett Thompson

Point scorers

37 points
 Andrew Knewstubb

33 points
 Santiago Mare

32 points
 Madison Hughes

30 points
 Marcos Moneta
 Selvyn Davids

28 points
 Maurice Longbottom

27 points
 Scott Curry

25 points
 Napolioni Bolaca
 Jiuta Wainiqolo
 Dan Bibby

24 points
 Lachie Miller

20 points
 Ignacio Mendy
 Connor Braid
 Asaeli Tuivuaka
 Ben Harris
 Dan Norton
 Chihito Matsui

19 points
 Nathan Hirayama
 Waisea Nacuqu

18 points
 Ngarohi McGarvey-Black

15 points
 Lautaro Bazán
 Nick Malouf
 Josh Turner
 Justin Douglas
 Sireli Maqala
 Aminiasi Tuimaba
 Gavin Mullin
 Tim Mikkelson
 William Warbrick
 Stedman Gans
 Perry Baker
 Carlin Isles

14 points
 Ronald Brown
 Justin Geduld
 Andre Jin Coquillard

13 points
 Ryota Kano
 Johnstone Olindi

12 points
 Jerry Tuwai
 Billy Dardis
 Stephen Tomasin

10 points
 Luciano González
 Matías Osadczuk
 Samu Kerevi
 Harry Jones
 Meli Derenalagi
 Alex Davis
 Ollie Lindsay-Hague
 Jordan Conroy
 Hugo Lennox
 Harry McNulty
 Kazushi Hano
 Lote Tuqiri
 Collins Injera
 Jeff Oluoch
 Dylan Collier
 Sione Molia
 Regan Ware
 Siviwe Soyizwapi
 Andre Jin Coquillard
 Yeon Sik Jeong
 Martin Iosefo

9 points
 Gastón Revol

8 points
 Branco du Preez

7 points
 Patrick Kay
 Mark Roche
 Daniel Taabu
 Joe Webber

5 points
 Santiago Álvarez
 Lucio Cinti

5 points (cont.)
 Rodrigo Isgro
 Germán Schulz
 Lachie Anderson
 Nathan Lawson
 Dylan Pietsch
 Dietrich Roache
 Phil Berna
 Theo Sauder
 Iosefo Masi
 Semi Radradra
 Robbie Fergusson
 Harry Glover
 Ross McCann
 Tom Mitchell
 Ethan Waddleton
 Foster Horan
 Terry Kennedy
 Masakatsu Hikosaka
 Kameli Soejima
 Willy Ambaka
 Andrew Amonde
 Jacob Ojee
 Vincent Onyala
 Alvin Otieno
 Etene Nanai-Seturo
 Kurt-Lee Arendse
 Zain Davids
 Chris Dry
 Sako Makata
 JC Pretorius
 Impi Visser
 Jeong Min Jang
 Danny Barrett
 Joe Schroeder
 Brett Thompson

4 points
 Josh Coward
 Vilimoni Botitu
 Yoshikazu Fujita
 Eden Agero

2 points
 Felipe del Mestre
 Lewis Holland
 Kalione Nasoko
 Kazuhiro Goya

References

External links

 
Men's tournament